The Initiative for the Integration of South American Infrastructure is a project via which countries of the Andean Community are attempting to further integrate their economies, especially by creating better road infrastructure connecting from Panama City in the north to major cities in South America.

See also
 Plan Puebla Panama
 Free Trade Agreement of the Americas
 Central American Free Trade Agreement
 Plan Puebla Panama
 Trans-Texas Corridor

External links
https://web.archive.org/web/20050908094012/http://www.caf.com/view/index.asp?ms=11&pageMs=14448

Geography of South America